Barnett Hospital and Nursing School is a historic hospital and school building located at Huntington, Cabell County, West Virginia. It is a three-story, rectangular building measuring 29 feet wide and 100 feet deep. It features a low-pitched, Mediterranean-style, hipped roof with clay Spanish tile. The original building was built as a frame dwelling, with subsequent additions in 1912, 1918, and 1925.  The hospital was opened in 1912 by Dr. Clinton Constantine “C.C.” Barnett and served the African American population of Huntington. The Barnett Nursing School opened in 1918.  The hospital closed in 1939.  The Trustees of International Hod Carriers’, Building and Common Laborers’ Union owned the building from 1947 until 2007.

It was listed on the National Register of Historic Places in 2009.

References

Buildings and structures in Huntington, West Virginia
Defunct hospitals in West Virginia
Defunct schools in West Virginia
Former school buildings in the United States
Historically segregated African-American schools in West Virginia
Hospital buildings on the National Register of Historic Places in West Virginia
Mission Revival architecture in West Virginia
National Register of Historic Places in Cabell County, West Virginia
School buildings on the National Register of Historic Places in West Virginia
Spanish Revival architecture in West Virginia
Historically black hospitals in the United States
Hospitals established in 1912